The Northern Military Command is one eight Military Commands the Brazilian Army thee Northern Military Command or comando Militar do Norte cmnis responsible for the defenceBrazil's Northern border the CMN is the youngest  Brazil's military commands as it was activated on 13 March 2013 two Infantry Brigades specializing in Jungle warfare and one Military Regional command are subordinated to the CMN Its area responsibility covers the states  Maranhão Pará and Amapá and the northernmost area  the state  Tocantins

Current Structure 

 Northern Military Command (Comando Militar do Norte) in Belém
 Northern Military Command Administration and Support Base (Base de Administração e Apoio do Comando Militar do Norte) in Belém
 8th Military Intelligence Company (8º Companhia de Inteligência) in Belém
 15th Military Police Company (15º Companhia de Polícia do Exército) in Belém
 Military High School Belém (Colégio Militar de Belém) in Belém 
 8th Military Region (8ª Região Militar) in Belém covering the Maranhão, Pará and Amapá states
 HQ Company 8th Military Region (Companhia de Comando da 8ª Região Militar) in Belém
 Belém General Hospital (Hospital Geral de Belém) in Belém
 8th Military Service Circumscription (8ª Circunscrição de Serviço Militar) in Belém
 28th Military Service Circumscription (28ª Circunscrição de Serviço Militar) in Belém
 8th Logistics Group (8º Grupamento Logístico) in Belém
 HQ Company 8th Logistics Group (Companhia de Comando do 8º Grupamento Logístico) in Belém
 8th Supply Battalion (8º Batalhão de Suprimento) in Belém
 8th Transport Battalion (8º Batalhão de Transportes) in Belém
 8th Maintenance Battalion (8º Batalhão de Manutenção) in Belém
 8th Medical (Reserve) Battalion (8º Batalhão de Saúde) in Belém
 22nd Jungle Infantry Brigade (22ª Brigada de Infantaria de Selva) in Macapá
 HQ Company 22nd Jungle Infantry Brigade (Companhia de Comando da 22ª Brigada de Infantaria de Selva) in Macapá
 2nd Jungle Infantry Battalion (2º Batalhão de Infantaria de Selva) in Belém
 24th Light Infantry Battalion (24º Batalhão de Infantaria Leve) in São Luís
 "Amapá" Frontier Command/ 34th Jungle Infantry Battalion (Comando de Fronteira do Amapá e 34º Batalhão de Infantaria de Selva) in Macapá
 22nd Jungle Logistics Battalion (22º Batalhão Logístico de Selva) in Macapá
 22nd Jungle Cavalry Squadron (22º Esquadrão de Cavalaria de Selva) in Macapá
 22nd Construction Engineer Company (22º Companhia de Engenharia de Construção) in Macapá
 22nd Jungle Signals Company (22ª Companhia de Comunicações de Selva) in Macapá 
 22nd Military Police Company (22º Companhia de Polícia do Exército) in Macapá
 23rd Jungle Infantry Brigade (23ª Brigada de Infantaria de Selva) in Marabá
 HQ Company 23rd Jungle Infantry Brigade (Companhia de Comando da 23ª Brigada de Infantaria de Selva) in Marabá
 50th Jungle Infantry Battalion (50º Batalhão de Infantaria de Selva) in Imperatriz
 51st Jungle Infantry Battalion (51º Batalhão de Infantaria de Selva) in Altamira
 52nd Jungle Infantry Battalion (52º Batalhão de Infantaria de Selva) in Marabá
 53rd Jungle Infantry Battalion (53º Batalhão de Infantaria de Selva) in Itaituba
 1st Jungle Field Artillery Group (1º Grupo de Artilharia de Campanha de Selva) in Marabá
 23rd Jungle Logistics Battalion (23º Batalhão Logístico de Selva) in Marabá
 23rd Jungle Cavalry Squadron (23º Esquadrão de Cavalaria de Selva) in Tucuruí
 23rd Jungle Signals Company (23ª Companhia de Comunicações de Selva) in Marabá 
 33rd Military Police Platoon (33º Pelotão de Polícia do Exército) in Marabá

References

Commands of the Brazilian Armed Forces
Regional commands of the Brazilian Army